The Capture of Fez occurred in 1576 at the Moroccan city of Fez, when an Ottoman Empire force from Algiers supported the Moroccan prince Abd al-Malik in gaining the throne of Morocco against his nephew and rival claimant Mulay Muhammed al-Mutawakkil.

Background
The Saadi sovereign Abdallah al-Ghalib had been paying an annual tribute of vassalage to the Ottomans, his successor al-Mutawakkil had to accept the conditions of Murad III by the end of 1574 and pay annual taxes, however this did not prevent the Ottomans from supporting Abd al-Malik against him.

During his exile Abd al-Malik had learned Turkish, adopted the Ottoman dress, joined the Janissary corps and became a trusted member of the Ottoman establishment. Abd al-Malik petitioned Murad III for military assistance in seizing the Saadi throne from Al-Mutawakkil, he made a proposition of making Morocco an Ottoman vassal with little effort on the part of Istanbul.

Battle
In 1576 an Ottoman force commanded by Ramazan Pasha and Abd al-Malik left Algiers to install Abd al-Malik as the ruler of Morocco and vassal to the Ottoman sultan. Among its divisions was a contingent of Janissaries and two thousand troops led by Abd al-Malik himself. A decisive battle took place at ar-Rukn, near Fez, which Al-Mutawakkil lost, in part due to the desertion of his Andalusian contingents right before the battle. Abd al-Malik then occupied Fez on March 11, 1576. Al-Mutawakkil fled to Marrakesh but was defeated again and forced to take refuge in the Sous. Abd al-Malik assumed rule over Morocco as a vassal of the Ottomans. Murad III’s name was recited in the Friday prayer and stamped on coinage, two traditional signs of sovereignty in the Islamic world.

Aftermath
Abd al-Malik recognized the Ottoman Sultan Murad III as Caliph, and reorganized his army along Ottoman lines and adopted Ottoman customs, but negotiated for the Ottoman troops to leave his country in exchange for a large payment in gold, suggesting that he had a looser concept of vassalage than what the Ottoman sultan may have supposed. The two year reign of Abd al-Malik was understood by all to be a period of de facto Moroccan vassalage to Istanbul.

Abd al-Malik hastened to send his annual tax to Istanbul, the first annual tax he sent was 200,000 gold coins. In a letter that Abd al-Malik had written to the caïd of Tetuan dated 18 March 1576 he referred to himself as the servant of the Ottoman sultan and ruler of the Moors, Morocco, Marrakesh, Sous and Tarrudant. He conducted large scale reform movements in Morocco, hundreds of Turkish officers, technicians and craftsmen came to Morocco and entered his service. His brief reign opened a period of the “Turkification” of Morocco which continued under his successor Ahmad al-Mansur, Abd al-Malik spoke Turkish, dressed in Ottoman fashion, reorganised his administration and his army in imitation of Ottoman practices and used Ottoman Turkish titles for his officials.

Meanwhile, Al-Mutawakkil fled to Spain and then Portugal, when Sebastian of Portugal promised to help him regain his throne. This led to an expedition and the Battle of Ksar El Kebir in 1578, also known as the Battle of Three Kings which was a considerable defeat for the Portuguese and having lost their childless monarch Portugal passed into the hands of Spanish throne. Prior to the battle, Abd al-Malik had recognised himself as a vassal of the Sublime Porte.

Abd al-Malik was succeeded by his brother Ahmad al-Mansur who formally recognised the suzerainty of the Ottoman Sultan at the beginning of his reign while remaining de facto independent, however Ahmad stopped minting coins in Murads name, dropped Murads name from the Khutba and declared his full independence in 1582. These actions caused the Ottoman Sultan Murad III to begin preparations for an attack on Morocco, however Ahmad al-Mansur paid a tribute of over 100,000 gold coins and the attack was called off. During the same year, in 1582, Moroccan envoys attended the circumcision of the Ottoman prince Mehmed, they brought with them many expensive gifts, alongside the gifts was taxes which was paid to the Ottoman sultan. The Moroccan envoys returned to Morocco with an Ottoman document which stated that Ahmad al-Mansur was one of the branches of the Ottoman government of the Maghreb and was appointed to the aforementioned province with the order of succession, Ahmed al-Mansur had stated that he wished to be peacefully under the protection of the state. Ahmad al-Mansur paid an annual tribute of vassalage to the Ottomans, he paid this tribute until his death, his successor Moulay Zidan also paid an annual tribute of vassalage to the Ottomans. Despite this, al-Mansur was able to rule with nearly complete autonomy.

Notes

Fez, Morocco
Fez
Fez
Conflicts in 1576
1570s in the Ottoman Empire
16th century in Morocco